Romania competed at the 2011 World Aquatics Championships in Shanghai, China between July 16 and 31, 2011.

Diving

Romania has qualified 2 athletes in diving.

Women

Swimming

Romania qualified 2 swimmers.

Men

Women

Water polo

Men

Team Roster 

Dragos Constantin Stoenescu
Cosmin Alexandru Radu – Captain
Tiberiu Negrean
Nicolae Virgil Diaconu
Andrei Ionut Iosep
Dan Andrei Busila
Mihnea Chioveanu
Alexandru Barabas Matei Guiman
Dimitri Goanta
Ramiro Georgescu
Alexandru Andrei Ghiban
Kalman Janos Kadar
Eduard Mihai Dragusin

Group B

Playoff round

Classification 9–12

Eleventh place game

References

Nations at the 2011 World Aquatics Championships
2011 in Romanian sport
Romania at the World Aquatics Championships